Our Endless Numbered Days is the second full-length album from Iron & Wine. Released on March 23, 2004 on Sub Pop, it was the first non-solo effort by Sam Beam under his Iron & Wine moniker. Limited edition copies of the vinyl LP came with a bonus 7" vinyl single. Limited edition copies of the CD came with a bonus CD single. On January 29, 2019, Sub Pop announced that a deluxe edition of the album commemorating its 15th anniversary would be released on March 22, 2019, featuring previously unreleased demos of eight of the tracks from the original album.

The album's title comes from the lyrics of the song "Passing Afternoon": "There are things that drift away like our endless, numbered days."

Background
The album marked a change in Iron & Wine's sound, as it was his first produced in a professional studio. Beam's only previous album, The Creek Drank the Cradle, was recorded entirely on a four-track tape recorder at his home.

Reception

Our Endless Numbered Days has received widespread critical acclaim since its release. At Metacritic, which assigns a normalized rating out of 100 to reviews from mainstream critics, the album received an average score of 84, based on 21 reviews, which indicates "universal acclaim".

Track listing

Personnel
Musicians
Sam Beam - vocals, guitars, slide guitars, banjo, mandolin
Brian Deck - drums, percussion, keyboards
EJ Holowicki - bass
Patrick McKinney - electric guitar
Jeff McGriff - percussion
Jonathan Bradley - percussion
Sarah Beam - harmony vocals

Appearances in Popular Media
"Passing Afternoon" was played at the end of "Wilson's Heart," the finale of the fourth season of House. "Naked as We Came," "Trapeze Swinger" (a song not in this album) and "Sunset Soon Forgotten" were featured in the 2004 dramedy In Good Company.
"Each Coming Night" is featured in Miley Cyrus's 2010 film The Last Song.
"Naked As We Came" is featured at the end of the 4th episode of the 2nd season of The L Word, when Jenny has her hair cut by Shane. "Naked As We Came" is also featured in the 9th episode of the first season of Grey's Anatomy, when Cristina and Izzie plan a secret autopsy of a patient's sudden death. Claire Fuller's 2015 debut novel, Our Endless Numbered Days, is named after the album.

References

2004 albums
Iron & Wine albums
Sub Pop albums
Albums produced by Brian Deck